Heyking is a surname. Notable people with the surname include:

Werner Heyking (1913–1974), Danish actor
Elisabeth von Heyking (1861–1925), German novelist and travel writer
Rüdiger von Heyking (1894–1956), German officer and Lieutenant General of the Luftwaffe during World War II